American Affordable Aircraft was a firm based in Port Orange, Florida and prior to that in Daytona Beach, that marketed plans for a home-built aircraft, the AAA Vision.

The company appears to have gone out of business in about 2010.

References

External links
Company website archives on Archive.org

Companies based in Volusia County, Florida
Defunct aircraft manufacturers of the United States